Sairé is a municipality located in the state of Pernambuco, Brazil. Located  at 110.7 km away from Recife, capital of the state of Pernambuco. Has an estimated (IBGE 2020) population of 9,764 inhabitants.

Geography
 State - Pernambuco
 Region - Agreste Pernambucano
 Boundaries - Bezerros   (N);  Bonito    and Barra de Guabiraba   (S);  Gravatá   (E);   Camocim de São Félix    (W).
 Area - 195.46 km2
 Elevation - 663 m
 Hydrography - Ipojuca and Sirinhaém rivers
 Vegetation - Subcaducifólia and hipoxerófila
 Climate - Tropical hot and humid
 Annual average temperature - 24.0 c
 Distance to Recife - 110.7 km

Economy
The main economic activities in Sairé are based in agribusiness, especially tomatoes, tangerines, passion fruits; and livestock such as cattle, sheep and poultry.

Economic indicators

Economy by Sector
2006

Health indicators

References

Municipalities in Pernambuco